Jeotgalicoccus halotolerans is a gram-positive bacterium. It is moderate halophilic, it growth in the presence of 0–20% NaCl. The cells are coccoid, with a diameter of  0,6–1,1 µm.

References

External links
Type strain of Jeotgalicoccus halotolerans at BacDive -  the Bacterial Diversity Metadatabase

halotolerans
Bacteria described in 2003
Halophiles